John Cosgrove (1867 – 11 August 1925) was an Australian actor, writer and director who worked in theatre and films during the silent era. He sometimes collaborated with Bland Holt.

Personal life
Cosgrove had a turbulent personal life. He would borrow money so often he was nicknamed "The Great Australian Bite". His first daughter died when a few days old. Another daughter, Noel, died of tuberculosis at the age of nineteen. His son Bill died in a plane crash in 1943.

Filmography
The Luck of Roaring Camp (1911)
The Right to Love (1915)
The Noon Hour (1915)
The Turning Point (1915)
For Love of Mary Ellen (1915)
Queen of the Band (1915)
The Ever Living Isles (1915)
The Wayward Son (1915)
Desert Gold (1919)
Barry Butts In (1919)
The Man from Snowy River (1920)
Silks and Saddles (1921) – also story
Possum Paddock (1921)
The Betrayer (1921)
The Queen of Sheba (1921)
The Guyra Ghost Mystery (1921) – also directed
While the Billy Boils (1921)
The Gentleman Bushranger (1921)
Sunshine Sally (1922) – script

References

External links

John Cosgrove at National Film and Sound Archive
Some John Cosgrove Australian theatre credits at AusStage

1867 births
1925 deaths
Australian film directors
20th-century Australian male actors